Compathia is the fifth album release from experimental indie rock band, Six Organs of Admittance, released in 2003.

Track listing
"Close to the Sky"
"Run!"
"Wind in My Palm"
"Somewhere Between"
"Compathia"
"Gone Astray"
"Hum a Silent Prayer"
"Only the Sun Knows"

Personnel:
Ben Chasny - acoustic & electric guitars, vocals, percussion & bells, electronics, tapes
Ethan Miller - sitar on "Somewhere Between", electric destruction guitar on "Only the Sun Knows".
Ryan Hildebrand - stones, grass & bell on "Gone Astray"

2003 albums
Six Organs of Admittance albums